Balangir Lok Sabha constituency is one of the 21 Lok Sabha (parliamentary) constituencies in Odisha state in eastern India.

Assembly segments
Before delimitation in 2008, the legislative assembly segments, which constituted this parliamentary constituency were: Nawapara, Titilagarh, Kantabanji, Patnagarh, Saintala, Loisinga and Bolangir.

Following delimitation, at present this constituency comprises the following legislative assembly segments:

Members of Parliament
2019: Sangeeta Kumari Singh Deo, Bharatiya Janata Party
2014: Kalikesh Narayan Singh Deo, Biju Janata Dal
2009: Kalikesh Narayan Singh Deo, Biju Janata Dal
2004: Sangeeta Kumari Singh Deo, Bharatiya Janata Party

1999: Sangeeta Kumari Singh Deo, Bharatiya Janata Party
1998: Sananda Kumar meher, Bharatiya Janata Party
1996: Sarat Pattanayak, Indian National Congress
1991: Sarat Pattanayak, Indian National Congress
1989: Balgopal Mishra, Janata Dal
1984: Nityananda Misra, Indian National Congress
1980: Nityananda Misra, Indian National Congress
1977: Ainthu Sahoo, Janata Party
1971: R.R. Singh Deo, Swatantra Party
1967: R.R. Singh Deo, Swatantra Party
1962: Hrushikesh Mahanand, Ganatantra Parishad (later Swatantra Party)

Election Result
2019 Election Result
In 2019 election, Bharatiya Janata Party candidate Sangeeta Kumari Singh Deo defeated Biju Janata Dal candidate Kalikesh Narayan Singh Deo by a margin of 19,516 votes.

2014 Election Result
In 2014 election, Biju Janata Dal candidate Kalikesh Narayan Singh Deo defeated Bharatiya Janata Party candidate Sangeeta Kumari Singh Deo by a margin of 1,04,299 votes.

General Election 2009

See also
 Bolangir district
 List of Constituencies of the Lok Sabha

References

External links
Bolangir lok sabha  constituency election 2019 date and schedule
 

Balangir
Lok Sabha constituencies in Odisha
Balangir district
Subarnapur district